The Northeast Conference Men's Basketball Coach of the Year is a basketball award given to head coaches in the Northeast Conference (NEC). The award is granted to the head coach voted to be the most successful that season by the league's coaches. The award was first given following the 1982–83 season, the second year of the conference's existence, to Matt Furjanic of Robert Morris.

Howie Dickenman of Central Connecticut has won the most awards with four. Bashir Mason of Wagner has won three, and seven other coaches have won the award twice. One former NEC Coach of the Year has been inducted into the National Collegiate Basketball Hall of Fame as a coach: Jim Phelan (inducted 2001). Due to Phelan's success, in 2003 the NEC men's basketball coach of the year award was named in his honor. Also of note, the only year when the award was shared was in 1993 with Jim Phelan and Kevin Bannon as winners. The program with the most winners, both by total awards and distinct recipients, is former member Robert Morris, with six awards won by four coaches. Among current members, St. Francis Brooklyn and Wagner have the most by both criteria; each has had three coaches combine to win five awards. The only current NEC members without a winner are Sacred Heart, members since 1999, and Stonehill, which plays its first NEC season in 2022–23.

Winners

Winners by school
Years in this table reflect calendar years in which basketball seasons end. Since the basketball season spans two calendar years, each school's first year of membership in this table is the calendar year after its actual arrival in the conference.

Notes

References

NCAA Division I men's basketball conference coaches of the year
Coach
Awards established in 1982
1982 establishments in the United States